Laurie Goldrich Wolf (born  1956) is an American food writer and entrepreneur. Her husband since 1984, Bruce Wolf, who is a professional photographer, sometimes collaborates with her.

Education and early career
Wolf graduated from the Calhoun School in Manhattan and The Culinary Institute of America, worked as a chef and caterer, and as food editor for Mademoiselle and Child for 18 years. Wolf and her husband moved from New York to Portland in 2008.

Book writing
Wolf has written several children's books. Candy 1 to 20 (photography by her husband Bruce), which teaches children to read and count numbers with photographs of candy, received a Kirkus Reviews writeup that noted its "transformation of the familiar into the sweetly surprising", and a review from Publishers Weekly that called it an "especially kid-friendly approach to counting".

Her 2014 Portland, Oregon Chef's Table was described as "both as a cookbook and a restaurant guide", and a "powerful tour of Portland's current restaurant scene". The book contains a full chapter on brunch, a uniquely prominent facet of Portland's restaurant scene.

Her crowdfunded 2015 cookbook Herb: Mastering the Art of Cooking with Cannabis was coauthored with Melissa Parks, a graduate of Le Cordon Bleu in Minneapolis.

Since 2014, she has been the food writer for The Cannabist.

Business
Laurie and Bruce Wolf's Portland business Laurie & MaryJane produces sweet and savory cannabis edibles.

Personal life
Wolf is a member of Portland's Jewish community. Laurie and Bruce Wolf have two children.

Bibliography

References

External links

Author profile at Serious Eats
Laurie Wolf's recipes at Oregon Public Broadcasting

1950s births
Living people
American chefs
American cookbook writers
Cannabis in Oregon
Culinary Institute of America alumni
Jewish American writers
Writers from New York City
Writers from Portland, Oregon
Cannabis writers
Businesspeople in the cannabis industry
21st-century American Jews